The Ministry of Natural Resources and Environment of the Russian Federation is a ministry of the Government of Russia responsible for managing natural resources and the environment.

Alexander Kozlov has served as Minister of Natural Resources and Environment since 10 November 2020.

History
The ancestor of the Ministry of Natural Resources and the Environment is the State Mining and Geological Service, established by Peter the Great on October 2, 1700. After the collapse of the Soviet Union, the Ministry of Environment and the Ministry of Natural Resources were created on August 14, 1996. They were combined to form the Ministry of Natural Resources and the Environment on May 28, 2008.

Activities
The Ministry of Natural Resources and the Environment is responsible for the creation and enforcement of policies and regulations dealing with the environment, including conservation, regeneration, forestry and wildlife protection. It is also responsible for the exploration, management and conservation of the country's natural resources, including the management of the water supply, mineral deposit development, and the exploration of the country's territory and continental shelf. Finally, the Ministry also is in charge of regulating industrial and energy safety, and monitors geological and earthquake activities and development of state police and legal regulation in forestry affairs.

Departments
The Federal Service for the Supervision of Natural Resources
Federal Agency for Subsoil Use
Federal Water Resources Agency
Federal Service for Hydrometeorology and Environmental Monitoring
Federal Forestry Agency

List of Ministers of Natural Resources and Environment
 Yuri Trutnev (2004–2012)
Sergey Donskoy (2012–2018)
Dmitry Kobylkin (2018–2020)
Alexander Kozlov (2020–present)

See also

Water supply and sanitation in Russia
Environment of Russia
Environmental issues in Russia

References

External links
  

Agriculture
Environment
Russia
Organizations based in Moscow
Russia
Forestry in Russia
Russia
Environment of Russia